Tylomelania hannelorae is a species of freshwater snail with an operculum, an aquatic gastropod mollusk in the family Pachychilidae.

The specific name hannelorae is in honor of Hannelore Glaubrecht, who participated on the malacological research.

Distribution 
This species occurs in Lake Mahalona, Sulawesi, Indonesia. Its type locality is Lake Mahalona.

Ecology 
The females of Tylomelania hannelorae usually have 1-2 embryos in their brood pouch. Newly hatched snails of Tylomelania hannelorae have a shell height of 2.4-3.1 mm.

References

External links

hannelorae
Gastropods described in 2008